"The Gathering of Five" and "The Final Chapter" are interconnected 1998 story lines published by Marvel Comics. Both story lines are crossovers between the Spider-Man titles published at the time (The Amazing Spider-Man, Peter Parker: Spider-Man, The Spectacular Spider-Man, and The Sensational Spider-Man). It marked the cancellation of both The Spectacular Spider-Man and The Sensational Spider-Man, while also "rebranding" The Amazing Spider-Man and Peter Parker: Spider-Man by renumbering the issues to start again with a new "Issue One" (as mandated by Editor-in-Chief Bob Harras).

The story line proved controversial with fans, as it resurrected the character of Peter Parker's elderly Aunt May, who had been killed off at the height of the "Clone Saga" three years earlier in The Amazing Spider-Man #400. Tom DeFalco, who had left months earlier with his Spider-Man: Identity Crisis story line, originally had intended Peter and Mary Jane's daughter, May Parker, to be returned to them by Kaine. (This story thread was used later as the branching point for the MC2) Mackie and Byrne insisted they have the older May revived so she could fit into the new relaunch.

Plot summary

The Gathering of Five
After surviving an attempt on his life by supervillain Nitro, Norman Osborn makes a phone call to someone, telling them it was time for "the gathering of five".

Acquisitions
Norman Osborn and Gregory Herd have a meeting with Hamilton Cromwell of the Neomancers to try to persuade him to join The Gathering of Five and bring his piece to the ceremony. Cromwell wants no part of the ceremony and warns Osborn and Herd they should not perform the ceremony either. Herd returns later in his Override costume to steal Cromwell's piece. Spider-Man sees him entering the building and tries to prevent him from stealing the piece, but he can escape with the piece. Herd convinces Osborn to allow him to take Cromwell's place in the ceremony, instead of paying, for stealing the piece so he may try to heal his wife.

The Scriers mention a fight with Kaine but are still able to deliver a "package" to Osborn. Alison Mongrain is found by Joe Robertson in Paris.

A Hot Time in the Old Town
Spider-Man fights the Molten Man as he walks a straight line of destruction through the city in a trance-like state to try to kill Alison Mongrain, who has returned to New York City with Joe Robertson. Osborn convinces Morris Maxwell to bring his piece and join The Gathering of Five. Maxwell reveals that all participants in the ceremony must come willingly, to receive one of the possible five gifts and curses: power, knowledge, immortality, madness, and death.

Web of Despair
Madame Web asks Spider-Man to retrieve an artifact for her, and he does without knowing what it is. She then takes it to Osborn as she volunteers to be a participant in The Gathering of Five because she will die soon if she does not gain immortality from the ceremony. Norman Osborn's monologues that his time with the Cult of the Scriers allowed him to gather information on the ritual and the main artifact.

A Day in the Life
Spider-Man stops various minor crimes and an unknown person brings the last piece for The Gathering of Five to Osborn.

Gifts
Spider-Man stops Override after he robs an armored car. While in police custody he can escape and reclaim the money he stole. He steals the money so his wife Annie will be fine in case anything goes wrong during The Gathering of Five.<ref>The Sensational Spider-Man vol. 1 #33</ref>

The Final Chapter
And Who Shall Claim a Kingly Crown?
Mattie Franklin is revealed to be the mystery person who brought the final piece necessary for the ceremony. The Gathering of Five is performed and each participant appears to receive one of the gifts or curses. When the Molten Man attacks Alison Mongrain and Joe Robertson in front of the Parker house it is revealed that Osborn implanted something in his brain so that he would ceaselessly go after the tracking device that he had given to Mongrain as a necklace. Mongrain gives the Molten Man the necklace for him to destroy, but after his attack had already fatally wounded her. Before she dies she can tell Mary Jane "May is alive."

Let the Heavens Tremble at the Power of the Goblin
Spider-Man fights the Green Goblin as he tries to get to the Osborn hunting lodge in upstate New York. Spider-Man believes the Green Goblin is holding his daughter alive there and that she did not die at the end of the Clone Saga because of what Mongrain told MJ. At the end of the issue, it is revealed that Aunt May is alive and the one the Green Goblin was holding prisoner.

The Triumph of the Goblin!
The Green Goblin allows Spider-Man to take Aunt May without a fight. Spider-Man brings her to Reed Richards to test what she is, believing her to be an imposter or clone. Using a blood sample from one of Peter's science experiments as a child Richards can confirm her identity, but there is a mysterious device implanted in her brain that will eventually kill her if not removed soon. Spider-Man then fights the Green Goblin until the Green Goblin declares that he has finally killed Spider-Man.

The Final Chapter
At the very beginning of the issue, it is revealed that the Green Goblin received the curse of insanity rather than the gift of power from The Gathering of Five and he only believes that he has killed Spider-Man. In reality, Spider-Man had defeated the Green Goblin and during the fight, while ranting like a maniac, the Green Goblin revealed that it was the real Aunt May currently under the care of Reed Richards and it was a paid actress infused with Aunt May's DNA who Spider-Man had believed to die before (in The Amazing Spider-Man #400). He also revealed that if the device in Aunt May's brain is removed it will trigger bombs all over the world. One final pumpkin bomb makes the Daily Bugle building nearly collapse until Spider-Man can save the building. He then is barely able to get to the hospital in time to tell Reed Richards about the device. Richards and the other surgeons can fix it so the device stays in Aunt May, thereby not triggering the bombs, while not killing her as it stays. Peter also tells Mary Jane that he is quitting his career as Spider-Man and burns his costume.

Reading order
The Gathering of Five
 The Sensational Spider-Man vol. 1 #32
 The Amazing Spider-Man #440
 Peter Parker: Spider-Man #96
 The Spectacular Spider-Man #262
 The Sensational Spider-Man vol. 1 #33
The Final Chapter
 The Amazing Spider-Man #441
 Peter Parker: Spider-Man #97
 The Spectacular Spider-Man #263
 Peter Parker: Spider-Man #98

Further exploration
Mainstream continuity
Aspects of The Final Chapter resurfaced in major story lines through the second volume of The Amazing Spider-Man. Following Peter's retirement, the true recipient of the Gathering's gift of power, Mattie Franklin, the niece of J. Jonah Jameson, assumed the role of Spider-Man, but her inexperience led to a brutal assault at the hands of another "Gathering" recipient, Gregory Herd. Peter saved Franklin, shielding his own identity, and reclaimed the mantle of Spider-Man in order to help Iceman take down Herd (as Shadrac). Franklin would later briefly become Spider-Woman,Spider-Woman vol. 3 #3 (1999). and was given her title, but she proved unpopular and the title was folded. Madame Web was also revealed to have gained the gift of immortality from "The Gathering of Five".

Shadrac was revealed to be Dr. Gregory Herd, a former mercenary named Override. Somehow, he changes into a flaming skeleton - after receiving the curse of death from the Gathering of Five - and becomes linked to a man named Dolman, who claims Osborn's agents stole the main ritual piece from him. A Dolman/Shadrac gestalt later comes to blows with Mattie Franklin and reveals he was an immortal whose prolonged contact with the pieces of the Gathering of Five granted him immortality.

Morris Maxwell becomes part of the supporting cast of Mattie Franklin's tenure as Spider-Woman. Madame Webb's immortality and Mattie's powers would fluctuate back and forth during the villainous Spider-Woman (Charlotte Witter) arc.

Norman Osborn would resurface as the Green Goblin in a loose trilogy of storylines written by Roger Stern, Howard Mackie, and Paul Jenkins in 2000, where Osborn reclaimed his sanity and brainwashed Peter, intending to mold him into a successor far worthier of the Osborn name than his son Harry.Amazing Spider-Man vol. 2 #25; Peter Parker: Spider-Man vol. 2 #25.

MC2The Final Chapter provides one of the more crucial aspects of the MC2 Spider-Girl timeline. Written by Tom DeFalco, the Spider-Girl title made full use of the intended climax to DeFalco's arc, returning the younger May to the Parkers rather than the elderly version. An alternate ending to this arc also kills off Osborn, and severely injures Peter, costing him one of his legs, and ending his career as Spider-Man. The gathering is not completed at this point in time (due to Peter's actions), but Mattie is seen escaping with the rituals equipment and later succeeding in gaining power for herself and youth for Madame Web as with the 616 continuity.  DeFalco later placed the events of the Gathering a further two years ahead after Mayday was returned to The Parkers.

In October 2008, the 25th issue of The Amazing Spider-Girl'' featured a back-up strip revealing how Kaine fought against the Brotherhood of the Goblin, infiltrated Norman's mansion, and recovered an infant Mayday, who was being cared for by the father of Fury The Goblin Queen, who was also present at the mansion that day as a young child. However, Norman had successfully cloned Mayday, creating a "twin" that would lay dormant in stasis for twenty years with notes left behind claiming her to be the true Mayday, with Fury passed down the code necessary to awaken her. This clone, known as "Project: Changeling" was eventually activated by Fury and assumed the life of the Mayday raised by The Parkers, who had been severely injured and abducted, Mayday however recovers and eventually persuades the clone to join her side and together they free Peter from the grip of Norman Osborn in a psychic duel.

Footnotes

References

External links

Comics by John Byrne (comics)
1998 comics debuts
Green Goblin